Leonard Peskett, OBE (1861 – 1924) was the Cunard Line's Senior naval architect, designer  and the designer of the company's ocean liners RMS Mauretania, RMS Lusitania, RMS Aquitania, and the RMS Carmania.

Peskett came to Cunard in 1884 from  H.M. Dockyard, where he had been an apprentice shipwright. He remained at Cunard until his death in 1924.

He is the author of the paper "The design of steamships from the owner's point of view," published in Transactions of the Institution of Naval Architects, London, 1914

References

Boat and ship designers
1861 births
1924 deaths
Officers of the Order of the British Empire